In American broadcast programming, "burning off" is the custom of quickly airing the remaining episodes of a television program, usually one that has already been or is planned to be cancelled, without the intent to attract a large number of viewers. In addition to airing episodes two at a time, this process may also include rescheduling the show to a lower-rated time slot, or transferring the show to a less visible sister network. A low-rated show that premiered in the early portion of the regular television season may return during the summer, only to have the final episodes "burned off."

Abandoned programs may be burned off for a number of reasons:
 The program must air to meet contractual or legal requirements.
 The production company needs enough first-run episodes to meet minimum requirements for broadcast syndication (though with the rise of streaming video platforms, this has become less of a concern).
 Their use as "filler" is perceived as slightly more profitable than reruns or other fillers.

Burn-off definition 
Up through the 1990s, contractual obligations often meant the airing of pilots for shows that were not going to be picked up, such as The Art of Being Nick, Poochinski, Heart and Soul, and Barney Miller, usually during the summer months to provide some form of 'new' programming in the technical sense of the word. In a few cases, the pilot may prove popular enough that a series is eventually commissioned; such was the case with Barney Miller and The Seinfeld Chronicles, the latter of which led to the long-running sitcom Seinfeld. Anthology series such as Love, American Style were devoted to many such failed pilots, most famously Garry Marshall's failed pilot, "New Family in Town", which was rebranded "Love and the Television Set" when aired as an episode of Love American Style; ABC ultimately changed its mind after all and picked up the series as Happy Days, itself leading to a number of pilots and spin-offs which had varying levels of success, including Laverne & Shirley and Joanie Loves Chachi.

The term can also apply to programming agreements or network affiliations where the ratings strength and programming quality of a network or syndicated program declines to a point where its existence can harm a station or cable channel's further existence. For instance, MyNetworkTV, which launched in 2006 with the intention of being a broadcast network with the same programming strength of its most direct competitor The CW, has declined to a programming service merely carrying syndicated crime dramas which themselves are already widely aired otherwise on other cable networks and streaming services. Because of this, many stations have pushed its programming to the graveyard slot due to its lack of viability, or even another digital subchannel. Thus, the service is being 'burned off' in a timeslot where it cannot cause further harm to the station's schedule.

Burning off of shows was more common on the main broadcast networks before the reality of reality television. While new episodes of cancelled shows would often earn decent ratings (by summer standards) compared to repeats of established shows, CBS's results in the summer of 2000 with a successful reality show in Big Brother and a massive blockbuster in Survivor led to a turn towards other less-expensive new reality-TV episodes during the summer and away from bothering to air burn-off products at all. The arc of the last 20 years (since around 2002) has been for cancelled shows to have unaired episode air in one of three locations: an affiliated cable network (the final episodes of Freaks and Geeks were shown this way), a DVD release of the show (which was not that common for most of these unsuccessful shows but did happen sometimes), and as part of a streaming deal.

Outside series with universal negative reception or other outside issues, the phenomenon has effectively become rare as of the late 2010s, with networks and services more apt to air the entire run of a series through another venue to assure the entire season will air.

Examples 
Individual entertainers who had signed to expensive contracts with a network but experienced diminishing returns early on in the contract would often have their contracts burnt off by having them appear in guest spots on variety shows and other low-priority projects. Milton Berle was tied into a contract with NBC that ostensibly tied him to the network until 1981, but by 1960, his star power had faded so dramatically that he had been reduced to hosting a bowling show to burn off the contract. This, too, failed, and Berle was released from his contract in 1961. Paul Lynde had signed a similar, shorter-term agreement with ABC, but after the failures of The Paul Lynde Show and ABC's efforts to shoehorn him into Temperatures Rising, Lynde was reduced to occasional specials (such as The Paul Lynde Halloween Special) and guest spots on other shows such as Donny & Marie; although Lynde found some success with the specials, his uncooperative behavior led to him being fired in 1978.  

After Jackie Gleason'''s 1961 panel game for CBS, You're in the Picture, was met with dismal reception, the following week's "episode" famously featured Gleason delivering a self-deprecating "apology" for the program. The remaining commitment to the timeslot was burned off as the talk show The Jackie Gleason Show.

In 2005, after facing insurmountable competition from the revival of Doctor Who, British network ITV burned off its professional wrestling-themed game show Celebrity Wrestling in a Sunday-morning timeslot.
 
Recent examples of summer burn-offs include Fox's Sons of Tucson (2010) and the NBC medical/fantasy drama Do No Harm (2013). Also burned off in 2013, was the NBC sitcom Save Me starring Anne Heche.

During the 2009–10 season, Fox aired 37 first-run episodes of the sitcom 'Til Death—22 season four episodes and 15 unaired episodes from season three. The series had been renewed for a fourth season only after Sony Pictures Television offered Fox a discount on the licensing fee in order to get enough episodes aired to compile a saleable syndication package. Several episodes of the series were burned off in unusual time slots, including: four episodes in a Christmas Day "marathon", two episodes being aired against Super Bowl XLIV, and three unaired third-season episodes being broadcast in June after the fourth season (and series) finale had already aired in May. The series' continuity also shifted throughout the season, as episodes were often aired out of order, leading to a situation where Allison Stark (the daughter of the main characters) was re-cast four times throughout its history and would have a different actress playing the character from episode to episode, eventually becoming a fourth wall-breaking running gag.Longsdorf, Amy (January 24, 2010) "Kate Micucci: 'Really exciting things are starting to happen'"  The Morning Call. Retrieved March 8, 2010.

In March 2014, the A&E series Those Who Kill was moved to Lifetime Movie Network (LMN) after A&E canceled the show following two low-rated episodes.

In 2020, ABC aired the sitcom United We Fall'', a series it otherwise would not have aired and had already released the actors from any further obligations to, through the summer, due to the COVID-19 pandemic disallowing the production of many of its usual summer programs.

See also

 Ashcan copy – comic books created to secure trademarks to titles rather than for popular distribution
 Filler (media) – material of lower cost or quality that is used to fill a certain television time slot or physical medium, such as a musical album

References

Television terminology